Eugénie Laetitia Bonaparte (Eugénie Laetitia Barbe Caroline Lucienne Marie Jeanne Bonaparte; 6 September 1872 – 1 July 1949) was the youngest daughter of Napoléon Charles Bonaparte, 5th Prince of Canino and princess Maria Cristina Ruspoli.

Eugénie was born in Grotta Ferrata, Italy. Her paternal grandparents were Prince Charles Lucien Bonaparte, nephew of Emperor Napoleon I, and Princess Zénaïde Bonaparte, niece of Napoleon and daughter of Joseph I of Spain. She had two older sisters: Zénaïde Eugénie, who died aged two in 1862, ten years before Eugénie was born; and Marie Léonie, who was two years older, born 10 December 1870.

On 16 November 1898 in Rome she married Léon Napoléon Ney (1870–1928), 4th Prince de la Moskowa, but the marriage ended in divorce in 1903.

Ancestry

References

1872 births
1949 deaths
Eugenie Bonaparte
Eugenie Bonaparte
Analysands of Sigmund Freud